Becoming Santa Claus is an opera in one act by composer Mark Adamo. Adamo also wrote the English language libretto for the opera. Commissioned by the Dallas Opera, the work had its world premiere at the Winspear Opera House on December 4, 2015. The opera has an approximate running time of 100 minutes.

Roles

See also
 List of Christmas operas

References

2015 operas
English-language operas
Operas by Mark Adamo
Operas
Christmas operas
One-act operas
Santa Claus